Tysha Ikenasio (born 13 September 1997) is a New Zealand rugby sevens player.

Rugby career
Ikenasio attended Sancta Maria College in Auckland and played netball and touch rugby representatively. She competed for New Zealand at the 2015 Touch World Cup in Australia.

Ikenasio played sevens professionally in Japan for five years, she played for the Tokyo Phoenix for two years before moving to the Nagato Blue Angels.

Ikenasio joined the Black Ferns Sevens Development Team in 2022. She played for the Black Ferns Pango team at the 2022 Oceania Sevens at Pukekohe. She was named as a non-travelling reserve for the Black Ferns Sevens squad for the 2022 Commonwealth Games in Birmingham.

References 

1997 births
Living people
New Zealand female rugby union players
New Zealand female rugby sevens players
New Zealand women's international rugby sevens players
People educated at Sancta Maria College. Auckland